B. Brett Finlay,  (born 4 April 1959) is a Canadian microbiologist well known for his contributions to understanding how microbes cause disease in people and developing new tools for fighting infections, as well as the role the microbiota plays in human health and disease. Science.ca describes him as one of the world's foremost experts on the molecular understanding of the ways bacteria infect their hosts. He also led the SARS Accelerated Vaccine Initiative (SAVI) and developed vaccines to SARS and a bovine vaccine to E. coli O157:H7. His current research interests focus on pathogenic E. coli and Salmonella pathogenicity, and the role of the microbiota in infections, asthma, and malnutrition. He is currently the UBC Peter Wall Distinguished Professor and a Professor in the Michael Smith Laboratories, Microbiology and Immunology, and Biochemistry and Molecular Biology, and Co-director and Senior Fellow for the CIFAR Humans and Microbes program. He is also co-author of the book Let Them Eat Dirt: Saving Your Child from an Oversanitized World and The Whole-Body Microbiome: How to Harness Microbes - Inside and Out - For Lifelong Health. Finlay is the author of over 500 publications in peer-reviewed journals and served as editor of several professional publications for many years.

Education 
Finlay received his B.Sc.(Honors) (1981) and Ph.D. (1986) in Biochemistry from the University of Alberta, and did his post-doctoral work at Stanford University with Dr. Stanley Falkow (1986-1989).

UBC Lab 
Finlay's lab is based in Vancouver, British Columbia, Canada in the Michael Smith Laboratories at the University of British Columbia, and involves a multidisciplinary research program exploring how microbes contribute to both human health and disease. The lab specifically focuses on type III secreted virulence factors from Salmonella and pathogenic E. coli, how microbiota influence infectious diarrhea outcomes, and the role of the microbiota in asthma, malnutrition, and environmental enteropathy.

Awards 
 The Canadian Medical Hall of Fame 2018 
 Prix Galien 2014
 Carnegie Fellowship 2015
 CIFAR Senior Fellow 2014
 German National Academy of Sciences Leopoldina Foreign Member 2012
 Queen Elizabeth II Diamond Jubilee Medal 2012
 Chair d'Etat College de France 2012
 Order of BC 2007
 Flavelle Medal Royal Society of Canada 2006
 Officer, Order of Canada 2006
 Killam Prize for Health Sciences 2006
 Fellow of the Canadian Academy of Sciences 2005
 Squibb Award, Infectious Diseases Society of America 2004
 CIHR Michael Smith Prize of the Canadian Institutes for Health Research 2004
 Fellow of the American Academy of Microbiology 2003
 UBC Peter Wall Distinguished Professor 2002
 Howard Hughes International Research Scholar 1991, 1997, 1999, 2000, 2001
 Fellow of the Royal Society of Canada 2001
 CIHR Distinguished Investigator 2001
 Steacie Prize 1998
 Fisher Prize 1991

Selected publications 
Diet and specific microbial exposure trigger features of environmental enteropathy in a novel murine model. Brown EM, Finlay BB, et al. Nat Commun. 2015 Aug 4;6:7806.
Early infancy microbial and metabolic alterations affect risk of childhood asthma. Arrieta MC, Stiemsma LT, Dimitriu PA,; CHILD Study Investigators, Mohn WW, Turvey SE, Finlay BB, et al. Sci Transl Med. 2015 Sep 30;7(307):307ra152. doi: 10.1126/scitranslmed.aab2271
Common themes in microbial pathogenicity revisited. BB Finlay, S Falkow. Microbiology and Molecular Biology Reviews 61 (2), 136-169
Enteropathogenic E. coli (EPEC) transfers its receptor for intimate adherence into mammalian cells. B Kenny, R DeVinney, M Stein, DJ Reinscheid, EA Frey, BB Finlay. Cell 91 (4), 511-520
Exploitation of mammalian host cell functions by bacterial pathogens. BB Finlay, P Cossart. Science 276 (5313), 718-725
Molecular mechanisms of Escherichia coli pathogenicity. MA Croxen, BB Finlay. Nature Reviews Microbiology 8 (1), 26-38
Manipulation of host-cell pathways by bacterial pathogens. AP Bhavsar, JA Guttman, BB Finlay. Nature 449 (7164), 827-834
More publications may be accessed at PubMed

Books
Finlay has co-authored a book for general audiences, Let Them Eat Dirt: Saving your child from an oversanitized world, about the critical role microbes play in early childhood development, having a major impact on both health and disease. It was published by Algonquin Books (USA) and Greystone (Canada) in Sept 2016, and is being translated into 11 languages

In The Whole-Body Microbiome: How to harness microbes - inside and out - for lifelong health, Finlay and his environmental gerontologist daughter Dr. Jessica Finlay focus on the teeming world of microbes everywhere in and around us. In this book, the Finlays suggest improvements to lifestyle, diet, and household practices to promote the right kind of microbial exposure.

Editorships 
 1992-1999 Trends in Microbiology: Infection, Virulence, and Pathogenesis
 1993-97 Editor, Infection and Immunity section, Canadian Journal of Microbiology
 1994-02 Editorial Board, Infection and Immunity
 1997-2005 Editorial Board, Molecular Microbiology
 1997–present Editorial Board, Current Opinion in Microbiology
 1997-2010 Editorial Board, Traffic
 1998–present Editorial Board, Microbes and Infection
 1999–present Editorial Board, Cellular Microbiology
 1999–present Advisory Board, International Journal of Medical Microbiology
 2000-2003 Editor, Infection and Immunity (20 manuscripts/month)
 2000–present Editorial Board, Current Drug Targets - Infectious Disorders
 2001–present Section Head (Cellular Microbiology and Pathogenesis) for Faculty 1000, an online service to organize and evaluate the life sciences literature
 2001–present Editorial Board, Current Biology
 2003 Section Editor (Cytology), American Society for Microbiology book, "E. coli and Salmonella"
 2005-2008 Reviews Editor, PLoS (Public Library of Science) Pathogens
 2005–present Editorial Advisory Panel, Future Microbiology         
 2006–present Editorial Board, Cell Host & Microbe
 2007–present Editorial Board, PNAS
 2009–present Associate Editor, Gut Microbes
 2009–present Editorial Board, mBio, American Society for Microbiology
 2009 Editor, Future Microbiology Special Focus Issue: The molecular basis of pathogenesis: proteomics and beyond.
 2010–present Editorial Advisory Panel (inaugural), Nature Communications, on-line multidisciplinary journal, Nature Publishing Group.
 2010–present Section Head, F1000
 February 2011 Section Editor, Current Opinion in Microbiology, Section: Host-microbe interactions: Bacteria.
 2011–present Member, Senior Medical Expert Panel, Nature Index
 2013–present Senior Editor, Future Microbiology
 2013–present Associate Editor, Gut Microbes
 2014–present Trends in Microbiology

Ventures 

Finlay has been a scientific founder of the following companies:
 Inimex Pharmaceuticals Inc., developer of medicines that use selective modulation of the innate immune response. The company's lead program was acquired by Soligenix.
Vedanta Biosciences Inc., rationally design medicines based on consortia of human commensal bacteria to treat disease, using insights from microbial ecology, mucosal immunology, and human interventional studies.
 Commense, focused on preventing and treating disease through microbiome-based interventions in infancy and early childhood
 Microbiome Insights Inc., leading microbiome testing company focused on next generation sequencing and bioinformatic analysis

References

External links
Whole body microbiome
Let them eat dirt

1959 births
20th-century Canadian male writers
Canadian microbiologists
Fellows of the Royal Society of Canada
Living people
Members of the Order of British Columbia
Officers of the Order of Canada
Stanford University alumni
University of Alberta alumni
Academic staff of the University of British Columbia
Writers from Edmonton